The Social Democratic Rally (RSD-Gaskiya) is a political party in Niger. Its president is Amadou Cheiffou and its first secretary-general is Mahamadou Ali Tchémogo.

History
The RSD-Gaskiya was founded by Cheiffou in January 2004 as a split from the Democratic and Social Convention (CDS), and fared well in the July 2004 municipal elections. In the 2004 general elections Cheiffou was nominated as the RSD candidate, receiving 6.35% of the vote and placing fourth out of six candidates; the party subsequently backed incumbent President Mamadou Tandja in the second round, which he won with 66% of the vote. In the parliamentary elections the RSD-Gaskiya receive 7.1% of the vote, winning seven of the 113 seats in the National Assembly.

In May 2009, the party was one of a handful of parties that supported President Tandja's call for a referendum to create a new constitution that would remove term limits on the presidency. After the referendum, the party placed second in the October 2009 parliamentary election amidst an opposition boycott; receiving 16% of the vote, it won 15 seats. Cheiffou was the RSD presidential candidate again for the 2011 general elections; he finished fifth in a field of ten candidates with 4% of the vote. In the parliamentary elections the party lost all 15 seats as its vote share fell to 1.8%.

The 2016 general elections saw Cheiffou run for the presidency again, finishing eighth out of fifteen candidates with 1.8% of the vote. However, the party regained parliamentary representation, winning four seats in the National Assembly.

References

Political parties in Niger
Social democratic parties
2004 establishments in Niger
Political parties established in 2004